Anselmo Lorenzo Asperilla (21 April 1841, in Toledo, Spain – 30 November 1914) was a defining figure in the early Spanish Anarchist movement, earning the often quoted sobriquet "the grandfather of Spanish anarchism," in the words of Murray Bookchin: "his contribution to the spread of Anarchist ideas in Barcelona and Andalusia over the decades was enormous".

His activity in the movement and adherence to Anarchist ideals can be rooted to his meeting and befriending of Giuseppe Fanelli in 1868, a disciple of Mikhail Bakunin recruiting for the International Workingmen's Association.  He would later become the subject of Lorenzo's works, along with Tomás González Morago, who an account considered the first Spanish Anarchist.

Paul Lafargue recruited Lorenzo and other Madrilenian printers (such as Pablo Iglesias and Jose Mesa) for the Spanish Regional Federation of the IWA. This association with Lafargue, a son-in-law of Karl Marx, led to the founding of the Madrid Internationalist paper called La Emancipacion, which promoted Marxist ideology. Lorenzo was listed as one of the delegates representing the Spanish Marxists in the International Workingmen's Association (IWMA) London Congress in 1864.

Lorenzo edited the anarchist syndicalist newspaper La Huelga General from 1901 to 1902 with Francisco Ferrer. He died on 30 November 1914 and was laid to rest on the Cemetery of Montjuïc.

References

Further reading 

 
 
 
 
 
 

1841 births
1914 deaths
People from Toledo, Spain
Confederación Nacional del Trabajo members
Spanish anarchists